The 2008 Belgian Cup Final, named Cofidis Cup after the sponsor, was played on Sunday, 18 May 2008 between Gent and Anderlecht, won by Anderlecht. It is the 53rd Belgian Cup Final.

Road to the Final

 Both clubs received a bye to round six.
 In square brackets is a letter that represents the opposition's division
 [D1] = Belgian First Division
 [D2] = Belgian Second Division

Match details

 Match rules
90 minutes
30 minutes of extra-time if necessary
Penalty shoot-out if scores still level
Five named substitutes
Maximum of 3 substitutions

References

Belgian Cup Final
Belgian Cup Final 2008
Belgian Cup Final 2008
Belgian Cup finals